Connor Scarlett (born 1992) is an English actor from Crowborough, East Sussex.
He is best known for his role in the teenage drama series The Cut from the BBC. He joined the series at the beginning of Series 2, alongside Lara Goodison, Matt Kane, Samuell Benta and Tosin Cole and has become one of the leading characters in the show. He portrays Alex Fitzpatrick and resumed his role for Series 3. He also plays recurring character Quinn in Wizards vs Aliens.

References

External links
BBC profile of Connor Scarlett and character Alex Fitzpatrick
 

1992 births
Living people
Male actors from Sussex